Rowing made a debut in the 2008 Summer Paralympics held in Beijing. There are four rowing events held in this sport which are men's/women's single sculls and mixed double sculls and four coxed. The single sculls are classed as A for arms only, the mixed double sculls are classed as TA for trunk and arms and the four coxed are classed as LTA for legs, trunk and arms. So far, 96 athletes have competed within the sport since 2008.

Medalists

Men's single sculls

Women's single sculls

Mixed double sculls

Mixed coxed four

References

External links
International Paralympic Committee

Medalists
Rowing
Rowing
Paralympic medalists